Kotzur is a surname. Notable people with the surname include:

Hilton Kotzur (born 1964), Australian rules footballer
Kevin Kotzur (born 1989), American basketball player